Madinah means city in Arabic, مدينة. Al Madinah with the definite article Al, (in Arabic المدينة, The City) is related to the Muslim holy city of Medina, or al-Madīnah, longer name, in Arabic المدينة المنوّرة Al-Madīnah al-Munawwarah).

Al Madinah, or Al Madinah Region, or Madinah Province, is a region of Saudi Arabia, located on the country's west side, along the Red Sea coast that includes Al-Madīnah al-Munawarah known as Medina. 

Madinah / Al Madinah may also refer to:

Places
Madinah Airport, better known as Prince Mohammad bin Abdulaziz Airport, a regional airport in Medina, Saudi Arabia
Madinah, Iran, alternatively Madineh, Madyaneh), village in Buzi Rural District, in the Central District of Shadegan County, Khuzestan Province, Iran

Education 
Al-Madinah International University, Malaysian university
Islamic University of Madinah, Saydi university in Medina
Al-Madinah School (New York City), Pre-K to 12th grades school in New York

Others
Al-Madinah Cultural Center, cultural center in Medina

See also
Medina
Medina (disambiguation)
Madina (disambiguation)